SPYSCAPE is a contemporary edutainment brand focused on secrets. SPYSCAPE's physical HQ in New York City uses immersive stories and experiences to help people uncover their own potential.  The 60,000-square-foot museum & experience was created by London-based private investment group Archimedia and designed by Sir David Adjaye.

SPYSCAPE HQ has seven main gallery zones: Encryption, which focuses on the cryptanalysts who cracked the German Enigma machine in WWII; Deception, which takes visitors through the FBI's hunt for KGB mole Robert Hanssen; Surveillance, a 360-degree room that presents a closer look at Edward Snowden; Hacking, highlighting the Anonymous (group); Cyberwarfare, which focuses on Stuxnet; Special Ops, which focuses on WWII spy gadgets and SOE Officer Virginia Hall; and Intelligence, which examines the how espionage and analysis shaped the Cuban Missile Crisis.

Visitors have the opportunity to test their own skills with various 'challenges' throughout the galleries - assessing traits from empathy and agility, to personality, brain power, and risk tolerance. The final gallery is Debrief, where visitors receive the results of their tests and challenges, and are assigned a spy role.

The latest installation, Batman x SPYSCAPE is an interactive adventure that tests visitors’ detective skills through a combination of a series of immersive physical spaces and a dedicated app for smartphones.

Driven: 007 x SPYSCAPE was the first official James Bond exhibit in New York City - opened between 2019 and 2022 in SPYSCAPE's south gallery. The focal point of the exhibit is the actual Aston Martin DB5 that was driven by Pierce Brosnan in the film GoldenEye. In response to the COVID-19 pandemic, SPYSCAPE made the 007 x SPYSCAPE exhibition available for free online following the temporary closure of the NYC venue.

In April 2020, SPYSCAPE launched a podcast network. The first show, True Spies, narrated by Hayley Atwell and Vanessa Kirby,  provides a unique insight into the world of secrets through interviews with professional spies. November 2022 saw Loki star Sophia Di Martino take over as host for the new series of True Spies, with the new series launching with The Bin Laden Files.

References

External links
 

2018 establishments in New York City
2010s in Manhattan
Eighth Avenue (Manhattan)
Espionage museums
History museums in New York City
Midtown Manhattan
Military and war museums in New York (state)
Museums established in 2018
Museums in Manhattan